8-Methoxymethyl-3-isobutyl-1-methylxanthine (MMPX) is a phosphodiesterase inhibitor.

References

Phosphodiesterase inhibitors
Xanthines